Ultimate Marvel Team-Up is a comic book series, published by Marvel Comics which ran for 16 issues, including a concluding Ultimate Spider-Man Super Special. It is set in one of Marvel's shared universes, the Ultimate Universe and is based on the original universe Marvel Team-Up. The whole series starred Spider-Man teaming up with another superhero each issue. The series was written by Brian Michael Bendis, with each arc drawn by a different artist.

Issues, artists and characters

Issue 1
 Starring: Spider-Man & Wolverine vs. Sabretooth
 Penciled and Inked by: Matt Wagner
 Trivia: Sabretooth's first appearance in Ultimate Marvel.

Issues #2-3
 Starring: Spider-Man & Hulk
 Penciled by: Phil Hester and inked by Ande Parks
 Trivia: Hulk's first appearance in Ultimate Marvel.

Issues #4-5
 Starring: Spider-Man & Iron Man vs. Latverian mercenaries
 Penciled and Inked by: Mike Allred
 Trivia: Iron Man's first appearance in Ultimate Marvel.

Issues #6-8
 Starring: Spider-Man, the Punisher (in issues #6-8) and Daredevil (issues #7-8)
 Penciled and Inked by: Bill Sienkiewicz
 Trivia: Daredevil & Punisher's first appearance in Ultimate Marvel.

Issue #9
 Starring: Spider-Man & Fantastic Four vs. the Skrulls
 Penciled and Inked by: Jim Mahfood
 Trivia: The events in this issue are not in Ultimate Marvel canon

Issue #10
 Starring: Spider-Man & Man-Thing vs Lizard
 Penciled and Inked by: John Totleben, with "art assistance" by Ron Randall
 Trivia: The Lizard and Man-Thing's first appearance in Ultimate-Marvel

Issue #11
 Starring: Spider-Man & the X-Men
 Penciled and Inked by: Chynna Clugston-Major

Issues #12-13
 Starring: Spider-Man and Doctor Strange vs. Xandu
 Penciled and Inked by: Ted McKeever
 Trivia: Doctor Strange's First Appearance in Ultimate Marvel

Issue #14
 Starring: Spider-Man & the Black Widow
 Penciled by: Terry Moore and inked by Walden Wong
 Trivia: Black Widow's First Appearance in Ultimate Marvel

Issues #15-16
 Starring: Spider-Man & Shang-Chi
 Penciled by: Rick Mays and inked by Jason Martin
 Trivia: Shang-Chi's First Appearance in Ultimate Marvel

Ultimate Spider-Man Special
 Starring Spider-Man, and many of the other headlined characters above, as well as a small appearance by Blade and Elektra.
 Art by Alex Maleev, Dan Brereton, John Romita, Sr., Al Milgrom, Frank Cho, Jim Mahfood, Scott Morse, Craig Thompson, Michael Avon Oeming, Jason Pearson, Sean Phillips, Mark Bagley, Rodney Ramos, Bill Sienkiewicz, P. Craig Russell, Jacen Burrows, Walden Wong, Leonard Kirk, Terry Pallort, Dave Gibbons, Mike Gaydos, James Kochalka, David Mack, Brett Weldele, Ashley Wood, and Art Thibert

Blade and Elektra's first appearance in Ultimate Marvel

Collected editions

Marvel Team-Up, Ultimate
Team-up comics